Zainab Elizabeth Donli, known as Lady Donli, is a Nigerian musician. She is an alternative R&B, hip hop, alternative jazz and Afrobeat singer and songwriter.

Biography 
Lady Donli was born in Cleveland, Ohio. She is the youngest of six children. She spent her early years in Abuja and Kaduna, where her dad is from. After her secondary school education, she moved to the United Kingdom where she obtained a degree in law, from the University of Surrey.

Donli's earliest musical influence was the Evangelical Church of West Africa, where a particular style of synchronous praise-chanting had become established. She was also influenced by the music of Brenda Fassie, Angelique Kidjo, Aṣa and Erykah Badu, as well as Nigeria's pop pioneers.

Donli is part of Nigeria's Alté music scene, which is known for blending sounds from multiple genres of music, including Afrobeat, R&B, and Soul. She released her first project, the 12-song mixtape Love or War, in 2014.

Donli has worked with new-age music acts like Adekunle Gold, Nonso Amadi, Tomi Thomas, M.I Abaga, Mr Eazi, SDC, Davido, Ayüü, Odunsi (The Engine), and Tay Iwar amongst others.

In 2018, Donli lent her vocals on a number of projects. She teamed up with Nigerian rapper, Boogey on 'Motion' and veteran MC Terry Tha Rapman on 'Open Letter'. She also worked with Mr Eazi on his sophomore album, 'Life is Eazi Vol.2', including a featured track off M.I Abaga's A Study on Self Worth: Yxng Dxnzl album.

In 2019, Donli released her debut album, Enjoy Your Life.

Discography

Studio albums and EPs
 Love or War EP (2014)
 Wallflower EP (2016)
 Letters to Her EP (2018)
 Enjoy Your Life (2019)
 WILD (2021)

Selected singles

Major features

Awards and nominations

References

Alumni of the University of Surrey
Nigerian singer-songwriters
21st-century Nigerian singers
Year of birth missing (living people)
Living people
Nigerian alté singers